PSR J1856+0245 is a pulsar  away from Earth. It shows similar properties to the Vela Pulsar.

PSR J1856+0245 is believed to be associated with HESS J1857+026, a pulsar wind nebula located in the same region of space.

References

Pulsars
Aquila (constellation)